Giovanni Scajario, also known as Scajaro, Scagliaro, Scaggiaro (1726–1792) was an Italian painter of the Rococo period, active mainly in Venice.

Biography
He was born in Asiago, son of Antonio Sajario, a painter. Giovanni was a follower, if not a pupil, of Giovanni Battista Tiepolo. He has frescoes in various palaces and churches in Veneto, including Palazzi Roberti in Bassano del Grappa, Mocenigo di San Stae, and Marin. He also painted for the churches of San Biagio in Venice, Sant'Anna in Valsugana, and a St Anthony of Padua for the parish church of Rotzo in the Province of Vicenza.

References

18th-century Italian painters
Italian male painters
Painters from Venice
People from Asiago
Italian Baroque painters
1726 births
1792 deaths
18th-century Italian male artists